Puritan Village: The Formation of a New England Town is a book by American historian Sumner Chilton Powell published in 1963 by Wesleyan University Press, which won the 1964 Pulitzer Prize for History.  It minutely examines the records of Sudbury, Massachusetts from 1638-1660 to show how the town developed mainly from emigrants from Watertown, Massachusetts, tracing every settler back to England, concluding that there were no typical "English" towns and no typical "Puritans".

References 

Pulitzer Prize for History-winning works
American history books
1963 non-fiction books
Wesleyan University Press books
Sudbury, Massachusetts
History books about the United States